MS4, or similar, may refer to:
 , a possible dwarf planet
 MS4 Modeling Environment, a software package
 Metal Slug 4, a video game
 Mississippi Highway 4
 Mississippi's 4th congressional district
 Municipal separate storm sewer systems required pursuant to United States law to regulate stormwater runoff